Jean-Aimé de Chavigny (1524?-1604) was a French astrologer and an alchemist. He was a disciple of Nostradamus. De Chavigny recorded the life of Nostradamus and considered himself to be Nostradamus's successor as prophet and astrologer. When Henry IV was to become King of France, de Chavigny reinterpreted many of Nostradamus’s writings to apply to Henry IV, although these prophecies not come true.

References 

 Mackenzie, Kenneth; The Royal Masonic Cyclopedia (London, 1877).
 Jean-Aimé de Chavigny; The Life and Testament of Michel Nostradamus. Preceded by Nostradamus Revisited an essay by Emmanuel Dufour-Kowalski. 
Collection The New Initiatical Bibliotheque. Serie 2. Slatkine Edition, Geneva, 2022.

Date of birth unknown
1604 deaths
French alchemists
French astrologers
16th-century alchemists
16th-century astrologers
17th-century alchemists
17th-century astrologers
Year of birth uncertain